Feucht Ost station is a railway station in the eastern part of the municipality of Feucht, located in the Nürnberger Land district in Middle Franconia, Germany. The station is on the Nuremberg–Regensburg line of Deutsche Bahn.

References

Nuremberg S-Bahn stations
Railway stations in Bavaria
Railway stations in Germany opened in 2010
Buildings and structures in Nürnberger Land